Karns is an unincorporated community and census-designated place in northwest Knox County, Tennessee, United States, about  northwest of the center of Knoxville. The population of the CDP was 3,536 at the 2020 census.

History
The community was formerly called Beaver Ridge. However, in 1913 when the first high school building was erected in Karns, the school was named in honor of Professor Thomas Conner Karns (1845–1911), the first Superintendent of Public Instruction for Knox County. Later, in the 1950s, the community voted to officially change its name from Beaver Ridge/Byington to Karns.

Geography
Karns is located in the Beaver Creek Valley between Beaver Ridge and Copper Ridge, both of which are elongate ridges typical of the Ridge-and-Valley Appalachians. The center of the community is located at  (35.982, -84.114). Beaver Creek, a tributary of the Clinch River, flows through the community.

Demographics

Economy
Karns has grown from primarily a farming area to a community with a population of over 19,000.  Mixed among the remaining farms and pastures are subdivisions, small businesses, schools, and light industry. Industries in the community include Unitrac Railroad Materials, a manufacturer of railroad components. The Karns schools are part of Knox County Schools, and including Karns High School, enroll over 3,700 students from Karns, Ball Camp, Hardin Valley, and Solway.  Most people commute to work outside of the community.

Education
Karns is the site of several public schools operated by Knox County Schools. Public elementary schools in the area are Karns Elementary School,
Ball Camp Elementary School, Amherst Elementary School, and Hardin Valley Elementary School. Three middle schools, Karns Middle School, Hardin Valley Middle School, and Northwest Middle School include grades 6, 7, and 8. The community's long-time high school is Karns High School. A new high school, Hardin Valley Academy, opened in 2008 to reduce pressure on Karns, Farragut, and Bearden High Schools due to growth in the student population in western Knox County.

In addition, it is the site of Grace Christian Academy, a K-12 private school operated as a ministry of Grace Baptist Church.

Public services
Karns is the site of a Knox County public library branch, a branch post office, and the Karns Community Club building.

The Karns Fire Department serves a  area of western Knox County from four fire stations located in Karns, Ball Camp, Hardin Valley, and Solway. Karns Fire Department provides fire suppression, emergency medical first responder services, public assists, and rescue services on a subscription-based service. 
Ambulance services are primarily provided by American Medical Response (AMR), per contract with Knox County.
The Knox County Sheriff's Department is responsible for law enforcement services.

References

Unincorporated communities in Knox County, Tennessee
Unincorporated communities in Tennessee
Knoxville metropolitan area